This article documents statistics from the 2011 Rugby World Cup, held in New Zealand  from 9 September to 23 October.

Team statistics
The following table shows the team's results in major statistical categories.

Source: ESPNscrum.com

Try scorers
6 tries

 Chris Ashton
 Vincent Clerc

5 tries

 Adam Ashley-Cooper
 Keith Earls
 Israel Dagg

4 tries

 Mark Cueto
 Vereniki Goneva
 Zac Guildford
 Richard Kahui
 Jerome Kaino
 Sonny Bill Williams
 Scott Williams

3 tries

 Berrick Barnes
 Drew Mitchell
 Ma'a Nonu
 Francois Hougaard
 François Steyn
 Alesana Tuilagi
 Jonathan Davies
 George North
 Shane Williams

2 tries

 Lucas González Amorosino
 Juan José Imhoff
 Anthony Fainga'a
 Ben McCalman
 David Pocock
 Phil Mackenzie
 Conor Trainor
 Ben Foden
 Shontayne Hape
 Manu Tuilagi
 Ben Youngs
 François Trinh-Duc
 Tommy Bowe
 Tommaso Benvenuti
 Sergio Parisse
 Giulio Toniolatti
 James Arlidge
 Heinz Koll
 Adam Thomson
 Victor Vito
 Vladimir Ostroushko
 Denis Simplikevich
 Kahn Fotuali'i
 George Stowers
 Simon Danielli
 Gio Aplon
 Jaque Fourie
 Bryan Habana
 Juan de Jongh
 Danie Rossouw
 Morné Steyn
 Siale Piutau
 Taulupe Faletau
 Leigh Halfpenny
 Mike Phillips
 Jamie Roberts
 Lloyd Williams

1 try

 Felipe Contepomi
 Julio Farías Cabello
 Santiago Fernández
 Genaro Fessia
 Juan Figallo
 Agustin Gosio
 Juan Manuel Leguizamón
 Ben Alexander
 Kurtley Beale
 Rocky Elsom
 Rob Horne
 James Horwill
 Digby Ioane
 Salesi Ma'afu
 Pat McCabe
 Stephen Moore
 James O'Connor
 Radike Samo
 Aaron Carpenter
 Ander Monro
 Jebb Sinclair
 Ryan Smith
 D. T. H. van der Merwe
 Delon Armitage
 Tom Croft
 Leone Nakarawa
 Napolioni Nalaga
 Netani Talei
 Thierry Dusautoir
 Maxime Médard
 Maxime Mermoz
 Lionel Nallet
 Pascal Papé
 Morgan Parra
 Julien Pierre
 Damien Traille
 Dimitri Basilaia
 Mamuka Gorgodze
 Lasha Khmaladze
 Rory Best
 Isaac Boss
 Tony Buckley
 Shane Jennings
 Rob Kearney
 Fergus McFadden
 Seán O'Brien
 Brian O'Driscoll
 Andrew Trimble
 Martin Castrogiovanni
 Edoardo Gori
 Luke McLean
 Luciano Orquera
 Alessandro Zanni
 Kosuke Endo
 Kensuke Hatakeyama
 Shota Horie
 Michael Leitch
 Hirotoki Onozawa
 Alisi Tupuailei
 Chrysander Botha
 Theuns Kotzé
 Danie van Wyk
 Jimmy Cowan
 Andy Ellis
 Andrew Hore
 Cory Jane
 Keven Mealamu
 Mils Muliaina
 Kieran Read
 Colin Slade
 Conrad Smith
 Brad Thorn
 Isaia Toeava
 Tony Woodcock
 Daniel Carpo
 Ionel Cazan
 Mihăiţă Lazăr
 Vasily Artemyev
 Alexey Makovetskiy
 Konstantin Rachkov
 Alexander Yanyushkin
 Tendai Mtawarira
 Gurthrö Steenkamp
 Anthony Perenise
 Paul Williams
 Joe Ansbro
 Mike Blair
 Sukanaivalu Hufanga
 Tukulua Lokotui
 Viliami Ma'afu
 Sona Taumalolo
 Fetu'u Vainikolo
 Paul Emerick
 JJ Gagiano
 Mike Petri
 Chris Wyles
 Aled Brew
 Lloyd Burns
 Lee Byrne
 Gethin Jenkins
 Alun Wyn Jones
 Sam Warburton

Drop goal scorers
3 drop goals

 Theuns Kotzé
 Dan Parks

2 drop goals

 Ander Monro
 François Trinh-Duc

1 drop goal

 Berrick Barnes
 Quade Cooper
 Jonny Wilkinson
 Johnny Sexton
 Dan Carter
 Aaron Cruden
 Konstantin Rachkov
 Tusi Pisi
 Ruaridh Jackson
 Morné Steyn

Point scorers

Kicking Accuracy

Correct as of Wales vs Australia

Hat-tricks
Unless otherwise noted, players in this list scored a hat-trick of tries.

Discipline
In total, two red cards and 18 yellow cards were issued during the tournament.

Yellow cards
1 yellow card

 Nicolas Vergallo (vs New Zealand)
 Dan Cole (vs Argentina)
 Dylan Hartley (vs Georgia)
 Fabrice Estebanez (vs Tonga) 
 Fabio Ongaro (vs Russia)
 James Arlidge (vs Tonga) 
 Rohan Kitshoff (vs Samoa) 
 Raoul Larson (vs Wales) 
 Sonny Bill Williams (vs Australia) 
 Mihaita Lazar (vs Argentina) 
 Konstantin Rachkov (vs Ireland) 
 Paul Williams (vs Namibia) 
 John Smit (vs Samoa)
 Halani Aulika (vs Japan) 
 Sukanaivalu Hufanga (vs France) 
 Tukulua Lokotui (vs Japan) 
 Blaine Scully (vs Australia) 
 Louis Stanfill (vs Italy)

Red cards
1 red card 

 Paul Williams (vs South Africa) Strike to the face of Heinrich Brüssow.
 Sam Warburton (vs France) dangerous tackle on Vincent Clerc.

Penalty tries
1 penalty try

Awarded against , vs 
Awarded against , vs 
Awarded against , vs 
Awarded against , vs

Stadiums

See also
 2015 Rugby World Cup statistics
 Records and statistics of the Rugby World Cup
 List of Rugby World Cup hat-tricks
 List of Rugby World Cup red cards

External links
Rugby World Cup 2011 Live Rugby World Cup Live (subscription required)
Rugby World Cup 2011 News From 3 News
Rugby World Cup 2011 News From RadioLIVE
Rugby World Cup 2011 Tournament statistics From ESPN Scrum

References

statistics
Rugby union records and statistics